Addie Pearl Nicholson (born 1931) is an American artist. She is associated with the Gee's Bend quilting collective, and she was the secretary of the Freedom Quilting Bee when it was incorporated in 1966. Since then, she has served as the cook for the Freedom Quilting Bee's daycare center, and as the president of the Bee.

Early life 
Nicholson was born in Dallas County, in an area called Pleasant Hill, near Selma, Alabama. Although, by and large, New Deal programs, particularly those concerning agriculture, such as the Agricultural Adjustment Act, Resettlement Administration, and the Farm Security Administration,  benefited white Americans more than black Americans, many families in Gee's Bend and the surrounding areas saw economic improvement during the New Deal era. For instance, Nicholson's family moved to Coy, Alabama when the McDuffie Plantation was broken up by the federal government for unfair sharecropping practices. Her father received 150 acres of arable land from this land seizure. Most black families were skeptical of the government program and moved north to avoid further systemic injustice.

Nicholson and her husband, Daniel Nicholson, met when she was 18 years old. They married soon after and moved to Gee's Bend to farm and raise a family. Gee's Bend does not have many new families, and they refer to the Nicholson family as "incomers", though they have lived there most of their lives.

Work 
Nicholson first began to make quilts when she was 16 and began making more after she married. Her husband, Daniel, proudly recalls helping her quilt, joking that, "She couldn't beat me sewing." Their quilts, like most, were utilitarian, mostly used to keep their children warm at night and comfortable when sitting in the fields.

References 

Quilters
1931 births
African-American women artists
Living people
21st-century African-American people
21st-century African-American women
20th-century African-American people
20th-century African-American women